The 1991–92 FC Schalke 04 season was the 68th season in the club's history and the first season playing in the Bundesliga since promotion from 2. Bundesliga in 1991. Schalke finished eleventh in the league.

The club also participated in the DFB-Pokal where it was eliminated in the second round by Rot-Weiß Erfurt.

Competitions

Overview

Bundesliga

League table

Matches

DFB Pokal

Statistics

Squad statistics

|}

References

FC Schalke 04 seasons
Schalke